Jama'at al-Tawhid wal-Jihad, which may be abbreviated as JTJ or Jama'at, was a Islamic extremist Salafi jihadist terrorist group. It was founded in Jordan in 1999 and was led by Jordanian national Abu Musab al-Zarqawi for the entirety of its existence. During the Iraqi insurgency (2003–11), the group became a decentralized network with foreign fighters and a considerable Iraqi membership.

On 17 October 2004, al-Zarqawi pledged allegiance to Osama bin Laden's al-Qaeda network, and the group became known as Tanzim Qaidat al-Jihad fi Bilad al-Rafidayn (commonly known as al-Qaeda in Iraq or Tanzim). After several mergers with other groups, it changed its name several times until it called itself Islamic State of Iraq (ISI) in 2006.

Origins 

Abu Musab al-Zarqawi was a Jordanian Jihadist who traveled to Afghanistan to fight in the Soviet–Afghan War, but arrived after the departure of the Soviet troops and soon returned to his homeland. He eventually returned to Afghanistan, where he ran an Islamic militant training camp near Herat.

A report released by the Washington Institute for Near East Policy in mid-2014 describes al-Zarqawi, with Jordanian and other Sunni Jihadist militants, as starting JTJ in 1999 in Afghanistan with its training camp in Herat, and with "a small amount of seed money" from bin Laden "which continued until 9/11".

Ideology and motivation 
Al-Zarqawi's interpretation of Islamic takfir—accusing other Muslims of heresy and thereby justifying his killing—was extreme, which caused friction between him and bin Laden. On his first meeting with bin Laden in 1999, al-Zarqawi reportedly declared: "Shiites should be executed".

Al-Zarqawi's political motives included what he considered the British Mandate for Palestine as a "gift to the Jews so they can rape the land and humiliate our people", the United Nation's support for American "oppressors of Iraq", and the "humiliation [of] our [Muslim] nation".

History

In Jordan (1999–2001) 
Al-Zarqawi started JTJ with the intention of overthrowing the 'apostate' Kingdom of Jordan, which he considered to be un-Islamic. After toppling Jordan's monarchy, presumably he would turn to the rest of the Levant.

For these purposes he developed numerous contacts and affiliates in several countries. His network may have been involved in the late 1999 plot to bomb the Millennium celebrations in the United States and Jordan.

In Jordan and Iraq (2001–2002) 

Following the 2001 US-led invasion of Afghanistan, al-Zarqawi moved to Iraq, where he reportedly received medical treatment in Baghdad for an injured leg.

Al-Zarqawi was in Baghdad from May until late November 2002, when he traveled to Iran and northeastern Iraq. The United States 2006 Senate Report on Pre-war Intelligence on Iraq concluded: "Postwar information indicates that Saddam Hussein attempted, unsuccessfully, to locate and capture al-Zarqawi and that the regime did not have a relationship with, harbor, or turn a blind eye toward al-Zarqawi."

Al-Zarqawi and his operatives are held responsible by the United States for the assassination of US diplomat Laurence Foley in Jordan in October 2002.

Involvement in the Iraq War (2003–2004) 
Following the US invasion of Iraq and the ensuing insurgency, Jama'at became a decentralized militant network fighting against the coalition forces and their Iraqi allies. Jama'at included a growing number of foreign fighters and a considerable Iraqi membership, including remnants of Ansar al-Islam.

Many foreign fighters arriving in Iraq were not initially associated with Jama'at, but once they were in the country they became dependent on al-Zarqawi's local contacts.

Jama'at's tactics included suicide bombings, often using car bombs, kidnappings, the planting of improvised explosive devices, attacks using rocket-propelled grenades, small arms  and mortars, and beheading Iraqi and foreign hostages and distributing video recordings of these acts on the Internet.

The group targeted Iraqi security forces and those assisting the occupation, Iraqi interim officials, Iraqi Shia and Kurdish political and religious figures and institutions, Shia civilians, foreign civilian contractors, United Nations and humanitarian workers, and also Sunni Muslim civilians.

Pledge of allegiance to al-Qaeda 
On 17 October 2004, al-Zarqawi pledged allegiance to Osama bin Laden's al-Qaeda network, and the group became known as Tanzim Qaidat al-Jihad fi Bilad al-Rafidayn (commonly known as al-Qaeda in Iraq).  Al-Zarqawi died in a US targeted airstrike in June 2006 on an isolated safe house north of Baghdad at 6:15 p.m. local time.

Activities

Attacks 

After the U.S.-led invasion of Iraq and the establishment of a governing Provisional Authority, an insurgency quickly emerged. Dozens of insurgent attacks were claimed by, or attributed to, JTJ in the following months:

 August 7, 2003: Jordanian embassy bombing in Baghdad which killed 17 and injured at least 40. The Jamestown Foundation considered Abu Musab al-Zarqawi and Jama'at al-Tawhid wal-Jihad responsible for this attack.
 August 19, 2003: Canal Hotel bombing that killed chief of the United Nations Mission to Iraq Sérgio Vieira de Mello and 22 others at the UN headquarters in Baghdad. More than 100 were injured. Zarqawi claimed responsibility for this attack in April 2004, saying the U.N. "gave Palestine to the Jews so they can humiliate our people" and are "friends of the [American] oppressors".
 August 29, 2003: the Shia Imam Ali Mosque bombing in Najaf that killed Ayatollah Sayed Mohammed Baqir al-Hakim and more than 85 others, was claimed by Al-Qaeda in Iraq (AQI), the New York Sun wrote in 2007. More than 500 were injured.
 November 12, 2003: The truck bombing in Nasiriyah which killed 17 Italian paramilitary policemen partaking in the U.S.-led 'Multi-National Force', and 10 civilians and injured at least 100. The Jamestown Foundation considered Abu Musab al-Zarqawi and Jama'at al-Tawhid wal-Jihad responsible for this attack.
 March 2, 2004: Series of bombings in Baghdad and Karbala that killed some 178 Shi'ite civilians and wounded at least 500 during the holy Day of Ashura. The Washington Institute for Near East Policy held "Zarqawi's group" responsible.
 April 19, 2004: Failed plot to explode chemical bombs in Amman, Jordan, said to be financed by Zarqawi's network.
 April 24, 2004: In a statement published on the Muntada al-Ansar Islamist web site, Zarqawi took responsibility for a series of suicide boat bombings of oil pumping stations in the Persian Gulf.
 May 18, 2004: Car bomb assassination of Iraqi Governing Council President Ezzedine Salim in Baghdad. The Jama'at group stated on an Islamist website that they were "determined to lift the humiliation from our nation (...) Another lion has removed the rotten head of those who betray God and sell their religion to the Americans and their allies".
 June 18, 2004: The suicide car bombing in Baghdad near an Iraqi Army recruitment center that killed 35 civilians, and wounded 145. Jama'at was blamed.
 August 1, 2004: six churches in Baghdad and Mosul were attacked, 12 people killed and 71 wounded. Iraq's national security adviser, Mowaffaq al-Rubaie, blamed the attacks on Abu Musab al-Zarqawi. 
 September 14, 2004: Car bomb killed 47 and injured nearly 100 civilians and police recruits on Haifa Street in Baghdad.
 September 30, 2004: Baghdad bombing which killed 41 people, mostly children. Jama'at claimed responsibility for attacks on the day, but it was unclear if this was included.
 The October 2004 massacre of 49 unarmed Iraqi National Guard recruits was claimed by JTJ.
 December 3, 2004: Failed attempt to blow up an Iraqi–Jordanian border crossing, for which al-Zarqawi and two of his associates were sentenced to death in absentia by a Jordanian court in 2006

Inciting sectarian violence 
Alleged sectarian attacks by the organization included the Imam Ali Mosque bombing in 2003 and the 2004 Day of Ashura bombings (Ashoura massacre) and Karbala and Najaf bombings in 2004.  These were precursors to a more widespread campaign of sectarian violence after the organization transitioned to become al-Qaida in Iraq, with Al-Zarqawi purportedly declaring an all-out war on Shias, while claiming responsibility for the Shia mosque bombings.

Beheading/killing non-Iraqi hostages 
 May 7, 2004: Nick Berg, American civilian beheaded. A video of the killing was published on the Internet; the CIA said it was likely that Abu Musab al-Zarqawi personally had wielded the knife 
 June 22, 2004: Kim Sun-il, South Korean civilian, executed by beheading.
 July 8, 2004: Georgi Lazov and Ivaylo Kepov, Bulgarian civilians beheaded
 August 2, 2004: Murat Yuce, Turkish civilian shot dead, by Abu Ayyub al-Masri.
 September 13, 2004: Durmus Kumdereli, Turkish civilian beheaded
 September 20, 2004: Eugene Armstrong, American civilian beheaded. Presumably claimed by Zarqawi and his men. Some sources claimed it was done by Al-Zarqawi personally. It was shown in Fitna, a LiveLeak film in 2008.
 September 21, 2004: Jack Hensley, American civilian beheaded. Presumably by Zarqawi and his men.
 October 7, 2004: Kenneth Bigley, British civilian beheaded. Presumably by Zarqawi and his men.
 October 29, 2004: Shosei Koda, Japanese civilian beheaded. An Islamist website that was used by al-Zarqawi's group had posted video of Koda shortly after the abduction. 
The Turkish translator Aytullah Gezmen was also abducted by Jama'at, but released after "repenting."

U.S. fighting Jama'at 
In September 2004, the U.S. conducted many airstrikes targeting Al-Zarqawi, calling the hunt for Al-Zarqawi its "highest priority".

Legacy 

The group pledged allegiance to Osama bin Laden's al-Qaeda network in a letter in October 2004 and changed its name to Tanzim Qaidat al-Jihad fi Bilad al-Rafidayn.

That same month, the group, now popularly referred to as al-Qaeda in Iraq (AQI), kidnapped and killed Japanese citizen Shosei Koda. In November, al-Zarqawi's network was the main target of the US Operation Phantom Fury in Fallujah, but its leadership managed to escape the American siege and subsequent storming of the city.

The Lebanese-Palestinian militant group Fatah al-Islam, which was defeated by Lebanese government forces during the 2007 Lebanon conflict, was linked to AQI and led by al-Zarqawi's former companion who had fought alongside him in Iraq.

The group may have been linked to the little-known group called "Tawhid and Jihad in Syria", and may have influenced the Palestinian resistance group in Gaza called Tawhid and Jihad Brigades.

See also 
 Abu Ayyub al-Masri
 Terrorism in Iraq
 Saddam Hussein and al-Qaeda link allegations
 Islamic State of Iraq and the Levant

References

External links 
 Brutal kidnappers gaining in popularity The Guardian on September 21, 2004
 Profile: Tawhid and Jihad group BBC News on October 8, 2004
 Purported Zarqawi letter Coalition Provisional Authority

Al-Qaeda activities in Iraq
Al-Qaeda in Iraq
Anti-Shi'ism
Defunct Islamic organizations
Defunct organizations designated as terrorist
Factions in the Iraq War
Foreign hostages in Iraq
Iraqi insurgency (2003–2011)
Jihadist groups in Iraq
Salafi Jihadist groups
History of the Islamic State of Iraq and the Levant
Paramilitary organizations based in Iraq
Sunni Islamist groups
Qutbist organisations
Defunct organizations designated as terrorist in Asia
Islamic organizations established in 1999
Organizations designated as terrorist by Malaysia
Organizations designated as terrorist by Kyrgyzstan
1999 establishments in Jordan
2004 disestablishments in Jordan
2004 disestablishments in Iraq